Fred Akers (March 17, 1938 – December 7, 2020) was an American college football player and coach. He served as head football coach at the University of Wyoming (1975–1976), the University of Texas at Austin (1977–1986), and Purdue University (1987–1990), compiling a career college football record of 108–75–3.

Coaching career
Akers' notable accomplishments as head coach at Texas include national title chances in 1977 and 1983. In both of those years, Texas went undefeated in the regular season only to lose in the Cotton Bowl Classic. Akers coached Earl Campbell in his Heisman Trophy-winning 1977 season.

Akers received criticism from those who believed he failed to match the standard set by previous head coach Darrell Royal. Twice in his tenure was the team undefeated and ranked in the top 2 of the AP Poll and twice they lost in the ensuing bowl game. However, much of that was mitigated by an impressive overall record and a winning mark against Barry Switzer of the Oklahoma Sooners, who was 3–0–1 against Texas before Akers came along. However, in Akers' last five years he struggled against Oklahoma, going 1–3–1, and against Texas A&M, losing his last three games to the Aggies by an average margin of 23 points. Akers drew ire from the Texas faithful for losing bowl games at the end of four consecutive seasons (1982–1985). During his tenure in 1978, Akers was lampooned by future Bloom County creator Berke Breathed, whose student strip The Academia Waltz appeared in the school newspaper. 

In 1986, after notching Texas' first losing record in 30 years, Akers left to become the head football coach at Purdue University, replacing Leon Burtnett. The Akers' hiring caused starting quarterback Jeff George to transfer, due to Akers' running style offense as compared to Burtnett's passing offense. At Purdue, Akers was not nearly as successful as he had been at Texas; his teams only won 12 games in four years, and after the worst season in Purdue's history in 1990 amidst discipline problems, Akers was asked to resign.  Akers was rumored as a candidate for the Baylor University job in 1993, that ultimately went to Chuck Reedy, but the Purdue post proved to be his final college coaching post.

In 1999, Akers served as head coach of the Shreveport Knights in the short-lived professional Regional Football League.

Personal life
Akers was a member of the Sigma Chi Fraternity.  In August 2008, Akers lived in Horseshoe Bay, Texas. Fred Akers died on December 7, 2020. He was 82 years old.

Head coaching record

College

RFL

References

1938 births
2020 deaths
Arkansas Razorbacks football players
Purdue Boilermakers football coaches
Texas Longhorns football coaches
Wyoming Cowboys football coaches
High school football coaches in Texas
People from Blytheville, Arkansas
People from Horseshoe Bay, Texas
Coaches of American football from Arkansas
Players of American football from Arkansas